The 2020 Swecon World RX of Sweden was the first and second round of the seventh season of the FIA World Rallycross Championship. The event was held at the Höljesbanan in the village of Höljes, Värmland.

Due to the COVID-19 pandemic, the event, originally planned as a "traditionalal sixth round", later became the first double header (two races in a weekend) of season.

Supercar Race 1 

Source

Heats

Semi-finals 

 Semi-Final 1

 Semi-Final 2

Final

Supercar Race 2 

Source

Heats

Semi-finals 

 Semi-Final 1

 Semi-Final 2

*Krisztián Szabó originally finished fourth but later was penalised 5 sec time penalty

Final 

*Johan Kristoffersson finished second, but was handed a five second time penalty immediately following the race after he was judged to have hit two track markers in the joker lap as he pushed hard to match Mattias Ekström

Standings after the event 

Source

 Note: Only the top six positions are included.

References 

|- style="text-align:center"
|width="35%"|Previous race:2019 World RX of South Africa
|width="40%"|FIA World Rallycross Championship2020 season
|width="35%"|Next race:2020 World RX of Finland
|- style="text-align:center"
|width="35%"|Previous race:2019 World RX of Sweden
|width="40%"|World RX of Sweden
|width="35%"|Next race:2021 World RX of Sweden
|- style="text-align:center"

Sweden
World RX
World RX